Gilbert is a 2017 American documentary film about the life and career of comedian Gilbert Gottfried. It opened in theaters on November 3, 2017.

Synopsis
 
The film depicts Gottfried's everyday life with his wife and two children. The film also depicts Gottfried's interactions (on occasion in his real voice) with his two sisters and his relationship with his parents. The film also discusses The Aristocrats joke told at the Hugh Hefner roast that occurred right after the September 11 attacks. Gottfried had just made a joke about a flight to California that had to make a stop at the Empire State Building. The film also discusses the controversy surrounding tweets Gottfried made after the earthquake disaster in Japan that led to his firing as the voice of the Aflac duck.

Cast
All appearing as themselves

Release
Gilbert premiered at the Tribeca Film Festival on April 20, 2017. The film was also shown at the 2017 Hot Docs Film Festival and the 2017 deadCENTER Film Festival The film was acquired by Gravitas Ventures and was released in New York City on November 3, 2017 and in Los Angeles on November 10, 2017. Gilbert was released on iTunes on November 14, 2017.

Reception

Critical response
The film earned high critical praise. On the review aggregator website Rotten Tomatoes, Gilbert has an approval rating of 95%, based on reviews from 22 critics. The website's consensus reads, "Gilbert pays tribute to a veteran comedian whose famously grating act belies his thoughtful personality -- and anchors a surprisingly insightful film."

Awards
Gilbert won the Special Jury Prize for Best Documentary at the 2017 deadCENTER Film Festival.

References

External links 

 
 
 
 
 

2017 films
2017 documentary films
American documentary films
Films set in New York City
Films shot in New York City
2010s English-language films
2010s American films
English-language documentary films